Manurewa is a New Zealand parliamentary electorate in southern Auckland. A very safe Labour seat, the seat was created in 1963 and has returned a National MP only once, in 1975.

Population centres
The electorate is based around the suburb of Manurewa. It includes Wiri, Manukau Central and Manukau Heights in the north. It stretches south to Clendon Park and Weymouth.

In boundary changes in 2002, some areas moved to Clevedon and Manukau East electorates. In the 2007 boundary review, Wattle Downs and parts of Manurewa East moved to Papakura electorate. Boundary changes for the 2008 election made Manurewa even safer for Labour, although some party loyalists were apparently upset that this had the effect of making the neighbouring seat of Papakura less marginal and more inclined towards National.

The 2013/14 redistribution did not change the boundaries further.

The 2019/20 redistribution saw the electorate shift northwards, gaining the area north of Puhinui Road from Manukau East and losing the area east of the Southern Motorway to the new  electorate.

History
Manurewa is generally regarded as a safe Labour seat. She was back on the list (in position 12) for the  but won her electorate comfortably.

Members of Parliament
Unless otherwise stated, all MPs' terms began and ended at general elections.

Key

List MPs
Members of Parliament elected from party lists in elections where that person also unsuccessfully contested the Manurewa electorate. Unless otherwise stated, all MPs terms began and ended at general elections.

1Calder became an MP on the resignation of Richard Worth in June 2009.

Election results

2020 election

2017 election

2014 election

2011 election

Electorate (as at 26 November 2011): 39,461

2008 election

2005 election

2002 election

1999 election

1996 election

1993 election

1990 election

1987 election

1984 election

1981 election

1978 election

1975 election

1972 election

1969 election

1966 election

1963 election

Table footnotes

Notes

References

External links
Electorate Profile  Parliamentary Library

New Zealand electorates in the Auckland Region
1963 establishments in New Zealand